Adi Kailasanathar Temple is a Siva temple in Vadakkur in Pudukottai district in Tamil Nadu (India).

Vaippu Sthalam
It is one of the shrines of the Vaippu Sthalams sung by Tamil Saivite Nayanar Appar. It is situated near Aranthangi. This place is found in Vadakkur, next to Avudaiyarkoil.

Presiding deity
The presiding deity is Adi Kailasanathar. The Goddess is known as Sivakami Ammai.

Other shrines
In the Prakaram shrines of  ValampuriVinayaka, Subramania with his consorts Valli and Deivanai, Bairava, Chandra and Surya are found.

References

Hindu temples in Pudukkottai district
Shiva temples in Tamil Nadu